Jane Morris (born 1969), is a female former judoka who competed for England.

Judo career
Morris is twice a champion of Great Britain, winning the heavyweight division at the British Judo Championships in 1994 and 1995.

Morris represented England and won a gold medal in the 72 kg half-heavyweight category, at the 1990 Commonwealth Games in Auckland, New Zealand.

References

1969 births
English female judoka
Commonwealth Games medallists in judo
Commonwealth Games gold medallists for England
Judoka at the 1990 Commonwealth Games
Living people
Gladiators (1992 British TV series)
Medallists at the 1990 Commonwealth Games